Alan J. Turcotte is a New Hampshire politician.

Career
On November 6, 2012, Turcotte was elected to the New Hampshire House of Representatives where he represents the Merrimack 22 district. Turcotte assumed office on December 5, 2012. Turcotte is a Democrat.

Personal life
Turcotte resides in Allenstown, New Hampshire.

References

Living people
People from Merrimack County, New Hampshire
Democratic Party members of the New Hampshire House of Representatives
21st-century American politicians
Year of birth missing (living people)